KDB may refer to:

Organizations
 Kansas Dental Board, US
 Korea Development Bank
 State Security Committee of the Republic of Belarus
 Soviet Committee for State Security (Ukraine)

Computing
 Kdb+, a database server
 KDB, a Linux kernel debugger

Other uses
 KDB (FM), a radio station, Santa Barbara, California, US
 KDB (Brunei) (Royal Brunei Ship), ship prefix
 Kidbrooke railway station, London, England (National Rail station code)
 Kambalda Airport, IATA airport code "KDB"
 Kevin De Bruyne, Belgian footballer

See also
 Beechcraft MQM-61 Cardinal, a target drone, formerly KDB-1